Granny Creek may refer to:

 Granny Creek (Missouri), a stream in Missouri
 Granny Creek (Elk River), a stream in West Virginia